Bezbozhnik (lit. godless) is the name of several rural localities in Russia:
Bezbozhnik, Bryansk Oblast, a settlement in Kozhanovsky Selsoviet of Gordeyevsky District of Bryansk Oblast
Bezbozhnik, Chuvash Republic, a settlement in Ivankovo-Leninskoye Rural Settlement of Alatyrsky District of the Chuvash Republic
Bezbozhnik, Kirov Oblast, a settlement in Bezbozhnikovsky Rural Okrug of Murashinsky District of Kirov Oblast
Bezbozhnik, Novosibirsk Oblast, a village in Tatarsky District of Novosibirsk Oblast

ru:Безбожник